The list of the 100 Italian films to be saved was created with the aim to report "100 films that have changed the collective memory of the country between 1942 and 1978".

History
The project was established in 2008 by the Venice Days festival section of the 65th Venice International Film Festival, in collaboration with Cinecittà Holding and with the support of the Ministry of Cultural Heritage.

The list was edited by Fabio Ferzetti, film critic of the newspaper Il Messaggero, in collaboration with film director Gianni Amelio and the writers and film critics Gian Piero Brunetta, Giovanni De Luna, Gianluca Farinelli, Giovanna Grignaffini, Paolo Mereghetti, Morando Morandini, Domenico Starnone and Sergio Toffetti.

The films 

In chronological order:
 Four Steps in the Clouds (Quattro passi fra le nuvole) by Alessandro Blasetti (1942)
 Ossessione by  Luchino Visconti (1943)
 Rome, Open City (Roma città aperta)  by  Roberto Rossellini (1945)
 Paisà  by Roberto Rossellini (1946)
 Shoeshine (Sciuscià)  by  Vittorio De Sica (1946)
 L'onorevole Angelina  by  Luigi Zampa (1947)
 Bicycle Thieves (Ladri di biciclette)  by  Vittorio De Sica (1948)
 La terra trema  by  Luchino Visconti (1948)
 Bitter Rice (Riso amaro)  by  Giuseppe De Santis (1949)
 City of Pain (La città dolente)  by  Mario Bonnard (1949)
 Heaven over the Marshes (Cielo sulla palude)  by  Augusto Genina (1949)
 Stromboli, terra di Dio by  Roberto Rossellini (1949)
 Chains (Catene)  by  Raffaello Matarazzo (1949)
 Path of Hope (Il cammino della speranza)  by  Pietro Germi (1950)
 Sunday in August (Domenica d'agosto)  by  Luciano Emmer (1950)
 Story of a Love Affair (Cronaca di un amore)  by  Michelangelo Antonioni (1950)
 Variety Lights (Luci del varietà)  by  Alberto Lattuada and Federico Fellini (1950)
 Father's Dilemma (Prima comunione)  by Alessandro Blasetti (1950)
 Bellissima  by  Luchino Visconti (1951)
 Two Cents Worth of Hope (Due soldi di speranza)  by  Renato Castellani (1951)
 Cops and Robbers (Guardie e ladri)  by  Steno e Mario Monicelli (1951)
 Miracle in Milan (Miracolo a Milano)  by  Vittorio De Sica (1951)
 La famiglia Passaguai by  Aldo Fabrizi (1951)
 Umberto D.  by  Vittorio De Sica (1952)
 Europa '51  by Roberto Rossellini (1952)
 The White Sheik (Lo sceicco bianco) by  Federico Fellini (1952)
 Toto in Color (Totò a colori)  by  Steno (1952)
 Little World of Don Camillo. (Don Camillo)  by  Julien Duvivier (1952)
 Bread, Love and Dreams (Pane, amore e fantasia)  by  Luigi Comencini (1953)
 I vitelloni  by  Federico Fellini (1953)
 Neapolitans in Milan (Napoletani a Milano)  by  Eduardo De Filippo (1953)
 Eager to Live (Febbre di vivere)  by  Claudio Gora (1953)
 The Wayward Wife (La provinciale)  by  Mario Soldati (1953)
 Neapolitan Carousel (Carosello napoletano)  by  Ettore Giannini (1953)
 Empty Eyes (Il sole negli occhi)  by Antonio Pietrangeli (1953)
 The Beach  by Alberto Lattuada (1954)
 The Gold of Naples (L'oro di Napoli)  by  Vittorio De Sica (1954)
 An American in Rome (Un americano a Roma)  by  Steno (1954)
 The Art of Getting Along (L'arte di arrangiarsi)  by  Luigi Zampa (1954)
 Senso  by  Luchino Visconti (1954)
 La strada  by  Federico Fellini (1954)
 A Free Woman (Una donna libera)  by  Vittorio Cottafavi (1954)
 The Abandoned (Gli sbandati) by  Francesco Maselli (1955)
 A Hero of Our Times (Un eroe dei nostri tempi)  by  Mario Monicelli (1955)
 Poveri ma belli  by  Dino Risi (1956)
 Il grido  by Michelangelo Antonioni (1957)
 Nights of Cabiria (Le notti di Cabiria) by  Federico Fellini (1957)
 Big Deal on Madonna Street (I soliti ignoti)  by  Mario Monicelli (1958)
 You're on Your Own (Arrangiatevi!)  by Mauro Bolognini (1959)
 The Great War (La grande guerra)  by Mario Monicelli (1959)
 I magliari  by  Francesco Rosi (1959)
 Everybody Go Home (Tutti a casa)  by Luigi Comencini (1960)
 La dolce vita  by  Federico Fellini (1960)
 Rocco and His Brothers (Rocco e i suoi fratelli)  by  Luchino Visconti (1960)
 Girl with a Suitcase (La ragazza con la valigia)  by  Valerio Zurlini (1960)
 Long Night in 1943 (La lunga notte del '43)  by  Florestano Vancini (1960)
 Il bell'Antonio by  Mauro Bolognini (1960)
 A Difficult Life (Una vita difficile)  by Dino Risi (1961)
 Divorce Italian Style (Divorzio all'italiana) by  Pietro Germi (1961)
 Il posto  by  Ermanno Olmi (1961)
 Accattone  by  Pier Paolo Pasolini (1961)
 Leoni al sole  by  Vittorio Caprioli (1961)
 Il sorpasso by Dino Risi (1962)
 Salvatore Giuliano  by Francesco Rosi (1962)
 L'eclisse  by  Michelangelo Antonioni (1962)
 Mafioso  by  Alberto Lattuada (1962)
 I mostri  by  Dino Risi (1963)
 Hands over the City (Le mani sulla città) by Francesco Rosi (1963)
 8½  by  Federico Fellini (1963)
 The Leopard (Il Gattopardo)  by  Luchino Visconti (1963)
 The Ape Woman (La donna scimmia) by  Marco Ferreri (1963)
 Chi lavora è perduto d by Tinto Brass (1963)
 La vita agra  by  Carlo Lizzani (1964)
 Fists in the Pocket (I pugni in tasca) by Marco Bellocchio (1965)
 I Knew Her Well (Io la conoscevo bene)  by  Antonio Pietrangeli (1965)
 Love Meetings (Comizi d'amore)  by Pier Paolo Pasolini (1965)
 The Birds, the Bees and the Italians (Signore & signori)  by  Pietro Germi (1966)
 The Hawks and the Sparrows (Uccellacci e uccellini)  by Pier Paolo Pasolini (1966)
 The Battle of Algiers (La battaglia di Algeri)  by  Gillo Pontecorvo (1966)
 China Is Near (La Cina è vicina)  by  Marco Bellocchio (1967)
 Dillinger Is Dead (Dillinger è morto)  by  Marco Ferreri (1968)
 Bandits in Milan (Banditi a Milano)  by  Carlo Lizzani (1968)
 Be Sick... It's Free (Il medico della mutua)  by  Luigi Zampa (1968)
 Investigation of a Citizen Above Suspicion (Indagine su un cittadino al di sopra di ogni sospetto  by  Elio Petri (1970)
 The Conformist (Il conformista)  by  Bernardo Bertolucci (1970)
 L'udienza  by  Marco Ferreri (1971)
 Diario di un maestro  by  Vittorio De Seta (1972)
 The Mattei Affair (Il caso Mattei)  by Francesco Rosi (1972)
 The Scientific Cardplayer (Lo scopone scientifico)  by  Luigi Comencini (1972)
 Nel nome del padre  by  Marco Bellocchio (1972)
 Amarcord  by  Federico Fellini (1974)
 We All Loved Each Other So Much (C'eravamo tanto amati)  by  Ettore Scola (1974)
 Bread and Chocolate (Pane e cioccolata) by Franco Brusati (1974)
 Fantozzi by Luciano Salce (1975)
 1900 (Novecento) by  Bernardo Bertolucci (1976)
 Illustrious Corpses (Cadaveri eccellenti) by Francesco Rosi (1976)
 A Special Day (Una giornata particolare) by Ettore Scola (1977)
 An Average Little Man (Un borghese piccolo piccolo)  by  Mario Monicelli (1977)
 Padre padrone by Paolo and Vittorio Taviani (1977)
 The Tree of Wooden Clogs (L'albero degli zoccoli)  by  Ermanno Olmi (1978)

References

See also
Film preservation
Cinema of Italy
List of films considered the best

Lists of Italian films